Laura Jean McKay (born 1978) is an Australian author and creative writing lecturer. In 2021 she won the Victorian Prize for Literature and the Arthur C. Clarke Award for her novel The Animals in That Country.

Life and career
McKay was born in Orbost, Australia, in 1978. She grew up on a horse farm in Sale, in the Gippsland region of the Australian state of Victoria. She worked at international aid organisations in Cambodia after the 2004 Indian Ocean earthquake and tsunami, and subsequently wrote Holiday in Cambodia while completing an MA in creative writing at the University of Melbourne. She completed a PhD at the University of Melbourne, where she wrote The Animals in that Country. Since June 2019 McKay has been a lecturer in creative writing at Massey University in New Zealand.

She has said that Janet Frame is one of her writing influences: "I still turn to Frame when I've forgotten how to flip the world over and look at it from a new perspective".

Holiday in Cambodia
McKay's first book, Holiday in Cambodia, a short story collection, was published by Black Inc. in 2013. It was shortlisted for the Glenda Adams Award for New Writing at the New South Wales Premier's Literary Awards, the Steele Rudd Award for an Australian short story collection at the Queensland Premier's Literary Awards, and the Asher Award. The stories in the collection examine the effects of expatriate life and foreign influence on Cambodian people.

The Animals in That Country

McKay's second book and debut novel, The Animals in That Country, was published by Scribe Australia in March 2020, by Scribe UK in September 2020, and by Scribe US in November 2020. A second edition was published in the UK in July 2021. The novel is a speculative fiction book about communication between species sparked by a pandemic, and was inspired by her experiences of the chikungunya virus caught at a writer's festival in Bali in 2013. She had started working on the novel at that time and its eventual release at the start of COVID-19 pandemic was a coincidence. McKay said of her experiences recording the audiobook in March 2020:

The title is a homage to an early poetry collection by Margaret Atwood. The Guardian described it as an "extraordinary debut", and "a stirring attempt to inhabit other consciousnesses and a wry demonstration of the limits of our own language and empathy". Slate editor Dan Kois selected it as one of his ten best books of 2020, and Simon Ings selected it as one of the five best science-fiction books of 2020 for The Sunday Times.

In February 2021, the novel won the Victorian Prize for Literature, Australia's richest literary award, as well as the Fiction Award at the Victorian Premier's Literary Awards. The novel also won an Australian Book Industry Award for Small Publisher's Adult Book of the Year, and an Aurealis Award for best science fiction novel (co-win with Corey J White for Repo Virtual). It was shortlisted for the ALS Gold Medal, the Readings Prize for New Australian Fiction, and the Stella Prize.

In September 2021 the novel was announced to be the winner of the Arthur C. Clarke Award, presented in the UK to the best science fiction novel of the year. The director of the award said "the novel speaks for the silent victims of our real-world climate crises, but while the environmental and social themes are deeply serious, our judges also praised the book's dark humour, sense of character and place, and its active opposition to easy genre tropes".

2022 onwards
In February 2022 Laura was awarded the NZSA Waitangi Day Literary Honour. In August 2022, Scribe announced that it had acquired Gunflower, a collection of short fiction by McKay, with publication planned for late 2023.

Selected works

References 

1978 births
Living people
Academic staff of the Massey University
University of Melbourne alumni
Australian science fiction writers
21st-century Australian women writers
21st-century Australian novelists
Australian women novelists
21st-century Australian short story writers
Australian women short story writers
Women science fiction and fantasy writers
People from Sale, Victoria
People from Orbost